Survivor Records is a British Christian Music record label and is a sub-ministry of Kingsway Communications. The label launched in 1997 as a medium by which to publish music associated with the Soul Survivor events. One of the first artists signed was Matt Redman, who had been involved with Soul Survivor for many years.

Notable artists

Rex Allchurch
Vicky Beeching
Brenton Brown
Lex Buckley
Tim Hughes
Martyn Layzell
Ben Cantelon
Beth Croft

LZ7
onehundredhours
Phatfish (now with Authentic Media)
Matt Redman
Andy Smith
Tree63
YFriday
Tom Field

See also
 Kingsway Communications
 List of record labels

References

External links
 Official site
 One Hundred Hours artist site

British record labels
Christian record labels